Sahara Cross is a 1977 Italian action film directed by Tonino Valerii. It is the first Italian film to use steadicam.

Plot

Cast 
Franco Nero as Jean Bellard
Michel Constantin as Carl Mank
Pamela Villoresi as Nicole
Mauro Barabani as Hamid
Antonio Cantafora as Georges (as Michael Coby)
Nazzareno Zamperla as Captain Zaft

Production
The film was originally very different than the completed film. Valerii stated that the film was originally titled Arissa Ballerina and written by Adriano Belli. Valerii commented that "In short, everything was the opposite of what Hitchcock recommended, that is, that characters must ignore what the viewer knows. I told the producers I would make a film out of that script, because it just made no sense!" Gastaldi and Valerii re-wrote the script, but struggled as the Tunisian co-production signed on to Belli's script. Gastaldi's contribution added new motivations for characters and included a few new scenes such as the battle between two bulldozers. Valerii wasn't initially happy with casting Pamela Villoresi, stating that "Sometimes you have to make do with compromises or economical limitations, Villoresi is a very good actress, but I wouldn't cast her as a terrorist, if it weren't for a pre-signed agreement."

The film was shot in nine weeks. It was shot at Cinecitta with exteriors shot in Tunisia. Valerii used a steadicam for the desert shots. As it was a very first model, director of photography Franco Di Giacomo and cameraman Gianfranco Transunto were sent for special training in Vienna to use it.

Release
Sahara Cross was released in Italy on September 7, 1977 where it was distributed by F.A.R. The film grossed a total of 706,960,000 Italian lira on its theatrical run.

Footnotes

References

External links

Sahara Cross at Variety Distribution

1977 films
Italian action films
1977 action films
Films set in Tunisia
Films shot in Tunisia
Films about terrorism
Films scored by Riz Ortolani
Films set in deserts
Films directed by Tonino Valerii
Films with screenplays by Ernesto Gastaldi
1970s Italian films